Ultimate Collection is a compilation album by American singer Pat Benatar, released in 2008. The two-CD collection features 40 songs, including 20 top 40 chart hit singles. The album only contains material that Benatar released under Chrysalis Records, material from her most recent studio albums: Innamorata (1997) and Go (2003), released prior to this compilation's release are excluded.

Benatar toured more than 40 cities across North America in 2008 in support of the release, performing her top hits and fan favorites.

Track listing

Personnel 

 Evren Göknar - mastering engineer

References

2008 compilation albums
Pat Benatar albums
Capitol Records compilation albums